Steve Cuddie (born June 18, 1950) is a Canadian retired professional ice hockey defenceman who played 221 games in the World Hockey Association for the Winnipeg Jets and Toronto Toros.

External links

1950 births
Living people
Buffalo Sabres draft picks
Canadian ice hockey defencemen
Cincinnati Swords players
Ice hockey people from Toronto
Salt Lake Golden Eagles (WHL) players
Toronto Toros players
Winnipeg Jets (WHA) players
Canadian expatriate ice hockey players in the United States